Patrick "Podge" Byrne (21 June 1903 – 16 January 1962) was an Irish hurler who played as a centre-back and midfielder for the Kilkenny senior team from 1927 until 1937.

Byrne made his first appearance for the team during the 1927 championship and became a regular player over the next decade. During that time he won three All-Ireland medals, seven Leinster medals and one National Hurling League medal.

Byrne enjoyed a two-decade long career with Dicksboro, winning two county championship medals.

His brother, Eddie Byrne, also played hurling with Kilkenny.

References

1903 births
1962 deaths
Dicksboro hurlers
Kilkenny inter-county hurlers
Leinster inter-provincial hurlers
All-Ireland Senior Hurling Championship winners